Pin Oak Creek is a stream in Johnson County in the U.S. state of Missouri. It is a tributary of Blackwater River.

Pin Oak Creek was named for the pin oak trees lining its course.

See also
List of rivers of Missouri

References

Rivers of Johnson County, Missouri
Rivers of Missouri